Horatio William Laborde (1821–1891) was an Anglican priest in  the nineteenth century.

He was born in St Vincent but educated at Gonville and Caius College, Cambridge; and ordained in 1845. After curacies in St Vincent and Trinidad he was Rector of St George with St Andrew, St Vincent from 1852 to 1888; Chaplain to the Bishop of Barbados from 1857 to 1853; Rural Dean of  St Vincent from 1864 to 1878 and Archdeacon of St Vincent from 1878 to 1891. He was also a member of the Legislative Council for St Vincent from 1866 until his death on 10 October 1891.

References

1821 births
People from Saint Vincent (Antilles)
Alumni of Gonville and Caius College, Cambridge
Archdeacons of St Vincent
1891 deaths